Qiu Shengjiong (born 1 September 1985, in Shanghai) is a Chinese football goalkeeper who currently plays for Shanghai Huajiao.

Club career 
Qiu Shengjiong, nicknamed "Big Ox" due to his massive size, would start his career playing for the Shanghai Shenhua youth team where due to his frame and size he was often criticized for being too fat to play football, he would nevertheless play within the 2005 National Games of China for Shanghai where he impressed many by starring within a semi-final penalty shoot out against Hubei and helped guide Shanghai to a runners-up position within the tournament. This would then see Shenhua offer him promotion into the senior team in 2006, however it wasn't until the 2007 Chinese Super League season when Qiu made his league debut on August 12, 2007 against Beijing Guoan F.C. in a 3-2 victory. That performance would then see Qiu rise to prominence within the team and he would replace Wang Dalei as the club's first choice goalkeeper throughout the rest of the season. During the start of the 2008 league season he started several league games before Wang Dalei regained his position as the club's first choice goalkeeper. When Jia Xiuquan became the team's Head coach the goalkeeping position was up for grabs once again and they equally shared the goalkeeping position throughout the 2009 league campaign until the 2010 league campaign saw Miroslav Blažević as the team's Head coach and he placed Qiu Shengjiong as the second choice goalkeeper. In recent seasons, due to Wang Dalei's stable performance and Shanghai Shenhua's usual early elimination from China FA Cup, Qiu's playing time was severely limited. On 20 December 2018, Qiu announced his departure from Shenhua after 15 years with the club.

On 26 February 2019, Qiu joined China League One club Guangdong South China Tiger.

International career
Due to his impressive performances at the end of the 2007 season he was called into the Football at the 2008 Summer Olympics – Men's tournament squad where he was first choice goalkeeper. However, due to disappointing results he was replaced by Liu Zhenli in the final group game.

Career statistics 
Statistics accurate as of match played 31 December 2020.

Honours

Club
Shanghai Shenhua
Chinese FA Cup: 2017

References

External links 

Player Profile at Shanghai Shenhua
Player Profile at football-lineups
Player stats at sohu.com

1985 births
Living people
Association football goalkeepers
Chinese footballers
Footballers from Shanghai
Footballers at the 2008 Summer Olympics
Olympic footballers of China
Shanghai Shenhua F.C. players
Guangdong South China Tiger F.C. players
Chinese Super League players
China League One players